The 1916 Dayton Triangles season was their fourth season in the Ohio League, and the first under the name, "Triangles".  The team posted a 9–1 record.

Schedule

Game notes

References
Pro Football Archives: Dayton Triangles 1916

Dayton Triangles seasons
Dayton Tri
Dayton Triangles